Elizabeth Persis Esperance Kirmse (1884, Bournemouth – 18 May 1955, Tunbridge Wells)  was a British artist and illustrator known for her works of cats and dogs.

She was the daughter of Richard and Lea Kirmse, respectively of German and Swiss origin, the proprietors of a private school in Hampshire. She produced oil paintings, works in pastels, and etchings of pets, often as commissions, and illustrated books, postcards, and calendars.

She produced illustrated versions of scenes from Shakespeare using animal characters, including Shakespeare at the Kennels (1934), Shakespeare with the Pets (1935), Shakespeare at the Zoo (1936) and Shakespeare and the Birds (1938). Her illustrations were also used in books by Frances Pitt and E.V. Lucas. Her work was exhibited at the Art Institute of Chicago in 1916.

Her sister, Marguerite Kirmse (1885–1954), was also an artist, specialising in etchings of dogs.

Published works
Author and illustrator
 
 
 
 

Illustrator

References

Further reading
 

1884 births
1955 deaths
20th-century English painters
20th-century English women artists
British people of German descent
Cat artists
Dog artists
English women painters
Artists from Bournemouth
Sibling artists